Yashwant Singh may refer to:
 Yashwant Singh (Lok Sabha member), member of the Lok Sabha from Uttar Pradesh
 Yashwant Singh (Uttar Pradesh Legislative Council member)
 Yashwant Singh (scientist), Indian theoretical physicist